The Little Savage is a 1959 adventure film directed by Byron Haskin. It stars Pedro Armendáriz and Christiane Martel. It is loosely based on an 1848 novel of the same name by Frederick Marryat.

It was one of the first films from Associated Producers Inc (API). It was originally announced for part of the slate of films for Regal Films.

Plot

Cast
Pedro Armendáriz as El Tiburon
Christiane Martel as Nanoa Riboud
Rodolfo Hoyos Jr. as Captain Taursus
Terry Rangno as Frank Henniger – as a boy
Robert Palmer as Frank Henniger – as a man

Production
Marryat's novel had been purchased in 1938 by Gaumont British as a vehicle for Will Fyffe.

References

External links
 
 
 
 
Original novel at Internet Archive

1959 films
20th Century Fox films
Films directed by Byron Haskin
Films based on British novels
Films based on works by Frederick Marryat
Pirate films
1959 adventure films
Films set on islands
1950s English-language films